West Glendive is a census-designated place (CDP) in Dawson County, Montana, United States. The population was 1,998 at the 2020 census.

Geography
West Glendive is located in south-central Dawson County at  (47.110710, -104.748022), on the west side of the Yellowstone River, across from the city of Glendive. (A portion of Glendive extends west across the river to touch the West Glendive CDP.) Interstate 94 passes through the CDP, with access from Exits 210, 211, and 213. I-94 leads southwest  to Miles City and east past Glendive  to Dickinson, North Dakota. Montana Highway 16 leads northeast from West Glendive  along the Yellowstone River to Sidney.

Demographics

As of the census of 2000, there were 1,833 people, 725 households, and 548 families residing in the CDP. The population density was 530.4 people per square mile (204.5/km2). There were 768 housing units at an average density of 222.2/sq mi (85.7/km2). The racial makeup of the CDP was 97.93% White, 0.27% African American, 0.33% Native American, 0.33% Asian, 0.05% Pacific Islander, 0.38% from other races, and 0.71% from two or more races. Hispanic or Latino of any race were 0.87% of the population.

There were 725 households, out of which 32.6% had children under the age of 18 living with them, 66.9% were married couples living together, 6.3% had a female householder with no husband present, and 24.3% were non-families. 21.7% of all households were made up of individuals, and 8.8% had someone living alone who was 65 years of age or older. The average household size was 2.52 and the average family size was 2.91.

In the CDP, the population was spread out, with 25.7% under the age of 18, 5.6% from 18 to 24, 27.0% from 25 to 44, 27.1% from 45 to 64, and 14.6% who were 65 years of age or older. The median age was 40 years. For every 100 females, there were 93.8 males. For every 100 females age 18 and over, there were 96.5 males.

The median income for a household in the CDP was $33,487, and the median income for a family was $40,242. Males had a median income of $31,582 versus $18,448 for females. The per capita income for the CDP was $16,100. About 11.2% of families and 14.3% of the population were below the poverty line, including 15.6% of those under age 18 and 18.4% of those age 65 or over.

See also

 List of census-designated places in Montana

References

External links

Census-designated places in Dawson County, Montana
Census-designated places in Montana